Peixe River or Do Peixe River or Rio do Peixe (peixe means fish in Portuguese) may refer to the following rivers:

Brazil
 Peixe River (Paraguaçu River tributary)
 Peixe River (Corumbá River tributary)
 Peixe River (Crixás Açu River tributary)
 Peixe River (Das Almas River tributary)
 Peixe River (lower Araguaia River tributary)
 Peixe River (Paraíba)
 Peixe River (upper Araguaia River tributary)
 Do Peixe River (Jaguari River tributary)
 Do Peixe River (Mato Grosso do Sul)
 Rio do Peixe (Mojiguaçu River tributary), in São Paulo state
 Do Peixe River (Pará River tributary)
 Do Peixe River (Paraibuna River tributary)
 Do Peixe River (Paraibuna River, São Paulo)
 Rio do Peixe (Paraná River tributary), in São Paulo state
 Do Peixe River (Santa Catarina)
 Do Peixe River (Cabo Verde River tributary)
 Do Peixe River (Tietê River tributary)
 Dos Peixes River (Mato Grosso)

See also
 Peixe (disambiguation)